Neoasterolepisma balcanicum is a species of silverfish in the family Lepismatidae.

References

Further reading

 

Lepismatidae
Articles created by Qbugbot
Insects described in 1922